Acleris dealbata is a species of moth of the family Tortricidae. It is found in Japan (Hokkaido, Honshyu) and Russia.

The wingspan is 13–16 mm.

The larvae feed on Salix species.

References

Moths described in 1975
dealbata
Moths of Japan
Moths of Asia